Amy Johnson (1903–1941) was a British pilot and the first aviatrix to fly solo from London to Australia.

Amy Johnson or Amy Johnston may also refer to:

 Amy Jo Johnson (born 1970), Canadian-American actress
 Amy Johnston (actress) (1954–2021), American actress

 Amy Johnston (dentist) (1872–1908), New Zealand dentist
 Amy Johnson, a proposed name for the cruise ship Pacific Dawn

See also

 Amy Johnson Avenue, a street in Darwin, Northern Territory, Australia
 Amy Johnson Lecture, sponsored by the British Royal Aeronautical Society